The NWA Southern Women's Championship (Florida version) was a National Wrestling Alliance's women's professional wrestling championship, It was created in 1953 and it was also a part of Championship Wrestling from Florida, the championship retired in 1961.

Title history

See also
Jim Crockett Promotions
National Wrestling Alliance
Championship Wrestling from Florida

Footnotes

References 

Championship Wrestling from Florida championships
National Wrestling Alliance championships
Regional professional wrestling championships
Women's professional wrestling championships
Women's sports in Florida